The 2006 Asian Games medal table is a list of nations ranked by the medals won by their athletes during the multi-sport event, which was held in Doha, Qatar, from 1 to 15 December 2006. The National Olympic Committees are ranked by number of gold medals first, with number of silver then bronze medals acting as the rank decider in the event of equal standing. Other alternative methods of ranking include listing by total medals.

Medal table

Changes in medal standings

References

 Overall Medal Standings - Doha 2006
 Doha official website

Medal table
2006